In Westminster and other parliamentary systems, a backbencher  is a member of parliament (MP) or a legislator who occupies no governmental office and is not a frontbench spokesperson in the Opposition, being instead simply a member of the "rank and file".

The term dates from 1855. The term derives from the fact that they sit physically behind the frontbench in the House of Commons. A backbencher may be a new parliamentary member yet to receive high office, a senior figure dropped from government, someone who for whatever reason is not chosen to sit in the government or an opposition spokesperson (such as a shadow cabinet if one exists), or someone who prefers to be a background influence, not in the spotlight. By extension, those who are not reliable supporters of all of their party's goals and policies and have resigned or been forced to resign may be relegated to the back benches. For example, in British political events, Clive Lewis became a backbencher after resigning from Jeremy Corbyn's shadow cabinet over Brexit, and Boris Johnson became a backbencher again, after resigning as Foreign Secretary in Theresa May's cabinet, also over Brexit. May herself returned to the backbenches after her resignation from the premiership, to be succeeded by Johnson.

In most parliamentary systems, individual backbenchers have little power to affect government policy. However, they play a greater role in the work of the legislature itself; for example, sitting on parliamentary committees, where legislation is considered and parliamentary work is done in more detail than there is time for on the floor of the House. In addition, since backbenchers generally form the vast majority of government MPs – and even their totality in dualistic parliamentary systems, where Ministers cannot serve as MPs simultaneously, collectively they can sometimes exercise considerable power especially in cases where the policies of the government are unpopular or when a governing party or coalition is internally split. Backbenchers carry considerable influence when the government majority is small; for example, Ariel Sharon's second government's plan of Israeli disengagement from the Gaza Strip was frequently obstructed by backbenchers from both junior partners in the right-wing coalition (such as the Mafdal and National Union) and dissenters in Sharon's own Likud party. Although the internal dissenters within the Likud eventually ejected Sharon and his supporters out of the party in late 2005, the Sharon-led Kadima party that resulted from the splinter remained in control of the government and went on to win the 2006 elections.

In some legislative assemblies, sitting at the back of the chamber is not necessarily associated with having a minor role. In Switzerland, senior figures sit in the back rows in order to have a better overview and be closer to the doors for discussions outside the plenary. In Germany, the party leaders sit in the front row, but there are no designated places for other senior figures. The term backbenchers ("Hinterbänkler") therefore refers to largely unknown MPs without much influence, regardless of where they sit. Originally, the importance of the front rows for the leaders had also to do with the fact that acoustics were often unsatisfactory before microphones were introduced. Prominent or iconic political figures can also play a backbench role, as the case of Aung San Suu Kyi illustrates: the leader of Myanmar's opposition to military rule was first elected MP in 2012, but proved only marginally involved in legislative business.

The term "backbencher" has also been adopted outside parliamentary systems, such as the United States Congress. While legislative branches in presidential systems do not share the firm front bench/back bench dichotomy of the Westminster system, the term has been used to denote junior legislators, or legislators who are not part of party leadership within a legislative body. When Democrat Tim Ryan of Ohio challenged Nancy Pelosi of California for House Minority Leader in 2016, The Washington Post reported that he "emerged from the backbench — he literally sits on the last bench in the chamber".

By country

United Kingdom

The most important backbench role many would argue is that of a constituency representative. Constituents rely heavily on their MPs to represent them in parliament and make sure their concerns are heard and welfare is looked after, whether or not they voted for the MP representing them. Constituents may email and meet their MPs, raising the issues and concerns they want the government to hear. Without this link many people would find it extremely hard for their voices to be heard fairly by the government. Backbenchers have an important opportunity to raise their constituents concerns directly to the prime minister in Prime Minister's Questions. Performing well in this constituency role is vital for backbenchers, as if they aren't prominent names in their party, their performance in their constituency could be a big factor on whether they will be re-elected to their seat in the next election.

Backbenchers also have an unofficial agenda-setting power, with Opposition Day debates, private member's bills, and Prime Minister's Questions available to place items on the parliamentary agenda which are awkward for the government. The Wright Committee reforms introduced in the UK provided backbenchers with much more power in committees, giving Parliament greater control of its agenda, increasing backbench membership in committees vastly.

Additionally, the Commons Backbench Business Committee was created in 2010 with has cross-party support. It debates matters unlikely to be debated in government time, with each decision voted upon formally. By the end of the 2010 coalition government it had undergone 300 debates, ranging from prisoner voting rights to the Hillsborough disaster. Furthermore, they have influence as discussed above when they are a member of a committee, these committees provide a perfect opportunity for backbenchers to have their voices heard in the legislative process. It usually proves difficult for backbenchers to be involved and have direct input in the legislative process when they are not involved in these activities.

There has been much speculation on the influence backbenchers actually hold in Parliament. Many believe backbenchers hold little to no influence, however, there has been much research to suggest they have a significant background influence. For example, Meg Russell analysed UK government bills and found that successful amendments were due to parliamentary pressure, 60 per cent of these being substantive, proving the majority of legislation undergoes unofficial parliamentary pressure. Russell also analysed the impact of the Wright Committee Reforms and whether it strengthened backbench power and influence. She found that the Wright Committee led to a significant reduction in governmental and whips' hold over the Commons agenda. Finding that backbenchers have more independence and power because of these reforms, and giving them far more opportunity to set agendas and have their voices heard in Parliament. Furthermore, Louise Thompson found that introducing oral evidence into committees scrutinising government bills had a significant impact on backbench influence. Acting as a vehicle for the formulation of significant changes to government bills, additional opposition scrutiny, and a debating tool. Oral evidence was most identified in undertakings given by ministers to committee members. Whereas, the number of amendments formally accepted by the government at committee stages is low. It found that oral evidence had a direct impact on bills 89 per cent of the time. This again suggests that backbenchers exert influence in the background of the Westminster legislation process. Therefore, it can be seen that although backbenchers have little official legislation powers in Parliament, they often exert significant background influence on the legislative process.

See also
Crossbencher
House of Commons of the United Kingdom

References

External links

 The BBC's definition of 'backbencher'
 Article/definition of 'backbencher'

Legislatures
Parliament of the United Kingdom
Organizational structure of political parties
Westminster system